Negalur  is a village in the southern state of Karnataka, India. It is located in the Haveri taluk of Haveri district in Karnataka.

Demographics
 India census, Neglur had a population of 7329 with 3757 males and 3572 females.

See also
 Haveri
 Districts of Karnataka

References

External links
 http://Haveri.nic.in/

Villages in Haveri district